Onocephala diophthalma is a species of beetle in the family Cerambycidae. It was described by Perty in 1830. It is known from Brazil.

References

Onciderini
Beetles described in 1830